The 1898–99 Northern Football League season was the tenth in the history of the Northern Football League, a football competition in Northern England.

Division One

The division featured 9 clubs which competed in the last season, no new clubs joined the league this season.

League table

Division Two

The division featured 4 clubs which competed in the last season, along with six new clubs:
 Scarborough
 Stockton St. John's
 Stockton Vulcan
 Thornaby
 Thornaby Utopians
 West Hartlepool

League table

References

1898-99
1898–99 in English association football leagues